Mahmoud Hosseini Zad (born 8 April 1946) is an Iranian translator of the contemporary German literature. He is also writer, interpreter, literature jury member and docent.

In the early 70s, Hosseini Zad graduated from the university of Munich in political science.  Then he came back to Iran and began to work as a translator for the Islamic Republic of Iran Broadcasting, IRIB, and also began to teach German language in the University of Tehran, Azad University, Tarbiat Modares University and language institutes in Tehran. At the same time he published two collections of short stories.

He has translated the works of Bertholt Brecht, Friedrich Dürrenmatt, Judith Hermann, Ingo Schulze, Uwe Timm, Peter Stamm, Julia Franck. He also wrote some plays, for which he was awarded.

Invitation by the Centre Dürrenmatt Neuchâtel 

In April 2015, the Centre Dürrenmatt Neuchâtel organized a reading and a discussion circle with Mahmoud Hosseini Zad as part of the Printemps culturel. He spoke about the Dürrenmatt's popularity in Iran, his own activities as a translator and he read from his translations. He said about the Dürrenmatt's works in an interview with Schweizer Radio und Fernsehen:

Hosseini Zad said about the censorship in Iran:

In an interview with Deutschlandfunk Kultur, he said about some sort of censorship lifting in the Rouhani's era:

– Mahmoud Hosseini Zad: Deutschlandfunk Kultur
He said about the cultural policy changes after Ahmadinejad:

Translations 
Genet, Jean: Les Nègres, Play, translation: Siabarzangiha, Tehran, 2017
Hermann, Judith: Aller Liebe Anfang, Novel, translation: Avval-e Asheghi, Tehran, 2015
Wustmann, Gerrit: Grüngewandt, poems in two languages, translation: Sabzpush, Bremen, 2014 
Widmer, Urs: Herr Adamson, translation: Agha ye Adamson, 2014
Schulze, Ingo: Handy, translation: Mobile, 2014 
Hermann, Judith; Özdamar, Emine Sevgi; Schlink, Bernhard; Schulze, Ingo; Stamm, Peter: short stories from various works, translation: Asseman-e khis (The Wet Sky), Tehran, 2012
Hermann, Judith: Alice, translation: Alice, Tehran, 2009
Krösinger, Hans Werner: Coming Home, translation: Bazgasht be vatan, Tehran, 2009
Stamm, Peter: Agnes, translation: Agnes, Tehran, 2009
Dürrenmatt, Friedrich: Das Versprechen, translation: Ghol, Tehran, 2008
Timm, Uwe: Am Beispiel meines Bruders, translation: Massalan baradaram, Tehran, 2008
Hermann, Judith, short stories from: Sommerhaus später and Nichts als Gespenster, translation: In souy-e roudkhane Oder (This Side of the Oder), Tehran, 2007
Dürrenmatt, Friedrich: Der Richter und sein Henker, translation: Ghazi o jalladash, Tehran, 1991, revised edition 2006
Dürrenmatt, Friedrich: Der Verdacht, translation: Sou-e zan, Tehran, 2006
Berg, Sibylle; Franck, Julia; Hermann, Judith; Schulze, Ingo: short stories from various works by the writers, translation: Gozaran e rouz (Spending the Day), Tehran, 2005
Böll, Heinrich; Handke, Peter; Kafka, Franz; Kant, Hermann; Mann, Thomas; Meckel, Christoph et al., short stories, translation: Maghbaredar o marg (Der Tod und der Gruftwächter), Tehran, 2005
Lange, Hartmut: Italienische Novellen, translation: Hemayat az hitsh, Tehran, 2005
Ostermaier, Albert: Erreger, translation: Virus, Tehran, 2005
Brecht, Bertolt: Baal, translation: Baal, Tehran, 2001
Brecht, Bertolt: Im Dickicht der Städte, translation: Dar jangal-e shahr, Tehran, 2001
Brecht, Bertolt: Trommeln in der Nacht, translation: Seday-e tabl dar shab, Tehran, 2001
Brecht, Bertolt: Einakter, translation: Tak pardei ha, Tehran, 1979
Gorky, Maxim: Über Kinderliteratur. Aufsätze und Äußerungen, translation: Darbare-ye Adabiyat-e Kudakan, Tehran, 1978

Own works 
Bist zakhm e kari (Twenty Mortal Wounds) - novel, Tehran, 2017
Sarash ra gozasht ruy-e Felez-e sard – az koshtan o raftan (He Put His Head on the Cold Metal – From Killing and Abandoning) – short stories, Tehran, 2015
Asseman, kipp-e abr (The Sky, Full of Clouds) – short stories, Tehran, 2013
In barf key amade... (When Did This Snow Fall...?) – short stories, Tehran, 2011
Siahi-ye chasbnak-e shab (The Leaden Darkness of Night) – short stories, Tehran, 2005
Tagarg amad emsal bar san-e marg (This Year the Hail Came Like Death) – play, Tehran, 1997
Nehade sar gharibane be divar (Like a Stranger She Leans Her Head on the Wall) – play, Tehran, 1996

Awards 
 2013: On 28 August, Hosseini Zad received the Goethe Medal for his services and commitment as a cultural mediator par excellence in literature, theater and film.
 2013: In a survey among the Iranian authors und critics by the Iranian cultural magazine Tajrobeh, The Sky, Full of Clouds was chosen as the best book of the year – in the category of story. 
 2012: In a survey among the Iranian authors und critics by the Iranian cultural magazine Tajrobeh, The Wet Sky was chosen as the best book of the year – in the category of translated stories.
 2012: The short stories When Did This Snow Fall ...? was awarded the Haft Eghlim literature prize.
 2010: The translation of Judith Hermanns book Alice was awarded the literature prize Es war einmal as the best translation of the year.

References

External links 

Iranian translators
Living people
1946 births